National Institute of Technology Rourkela (NIT Rourkela or NITRKL or NITR), formerly Regional Engineering College Rourkela is a publicly funded institute of higher learning for engineering, science and technology located in the steel city of Rourkela, Odisha, India. It is one of the 31 National Institutes of Technology in India and has been recognized as an Institute of National Importance by the National Institutes of Technology Act, 2007. It is ranked 15 in the NIRF Rankings 2022 of Indian engineering universities.

History
NIT Rourkela was established as Regional Engineering College (REC) Rourkela on 15 August 1961. Chief Minister of Odisha, Biju Patnaik provided the land for it, approximately 648 acres. Its foundation stone was laid by the first Prime Minister of India, Jawaharlal Nehru. It was granted autonomy in 2002 and now functions independently under the Ministry of Human Resource Development, thus becoming one of the National Institutes of Technology.

Campus

Location 

The Rourkela Steel City is a medium-sized metropolis, located on the Howrah-Mumbai and Ranchi-Bhubaneswar main railway routes, and well connected to all parts of the country by road and rail.  The population of the city is about 7 lakhs. The institute is about 7 km from the railway station. The campus of the institute consisting of the institute buildings, halls of residence and staff colony is situated at the eastern end of Rourkela, beyond Sector-1, on land provided by the Government of Odisha. The institute is bordered by small mountains on the south which are sometimes used as a picnic spot by students.

The closest domestic airport to Rourkela is Jharsuguda at a distance of 130 kilometers. Rourkela also has a private airport maintained by SAIL which is used only for official purposes.

Infrastructure 

The campus of the institute is situated at the eastern end of Rourkela steel city, beyond Sector-1, on land provided by the Government of Odisha. The courses are mostly residential on a full-time basis.

The institute area is at the centre of the campus and surrounded by the residential areas. The main building of the institute is in a central area and is surrounded by the departmental buildings. It houses all the classrooms, the Central Library, and the Administrative and Academic sections. It also houses departments like Physics, Chemistry, Mathematics, Life Science and Humanities. All the departments, the lecture gallery, the workshops, the institute canteen and the audio-visual hall surround the main building.

The lecture area and the department of biotechnology and medical engineering are situated behind the Department of Chemical Engineering. The new Department of Electrical and Electronics Engineering has come up behind the Department of Computer Science. The buildings of the Department of Chemical Engineering, Mining Engineering and Ceramic Engineering have an extension part.Residential accommodation is provided to all faculty, staff and students. There are eleven halls of residence for the students within the campus: seven for male graduates and postgraduates, two for female students and two for married students pursuing doctorate degrees and beyond or full-time research.

Student Activity Centre
The Student Activity Centre (SAC) within the central academic area is the hub of all extra-academic pursuits and is the main organizing office for all student symposiums and annual events. It is served by the approximately 400 seater Bhubaneswar Behera Audio Visual Auditorium and an approximately 1000-seat open air theater. Annually, SAC elections are held at the end of even semesters through online voting.

Health care
The institute is served by an on-campus dispensary (Health Centre) and the fully equipped Community Welfare Service (CWS) Hospital for medical treatments. All residential and non-residential students are insured for all medical expenses by the institute.

The student co-operative store facilitates the purchase of books and stationery at reduced prices. The on campus postal service is the state-owned India Post. The official on-campus banker to students and the institute is the state-run State Bank of India (REC Campus).

Institute library

The Biju Pattanaik Central Library, functional from 1965, was named after Biju Pattanaik, the former chief minister of Odisha. At present, the library holds about 85,000 books and 18,000 back volumes of periodicals. It has purchased a license to access over 2000 online research journals on science and technology to foster local research activity. The BPCL is automated with an integrated library software package called Libsys – LSmart and is modernized with the latest radio frequency identification (RFID)-based automation system that facilitates self check-in, self check-out, and an automatic security system. This technology offers the fastest, easiest, and most efficient way to track, locate and manage library materials. The RFID system counts more than 1.2 lakhs of transactions (issue, return, and renewal) in a year.

Administration and organisation

Governance

The institute is managed by a Board of Governors (BoG) created as per NIT Act of 2007. The Act is responsible for the overall superintendence, direction, and control of its affairs. The Director is responsible for managing the day-to-day affairs of the institute, and the director is the Principal Executive and Academic Officer. The BoG is assisted by the Senate, which frames the curriculum and conducts the examinations. The Senate also appoints advisory or expert committees to make recommendations to the BoG on academic matters related to various departments. The Building and Works Committee and the Finance Committee also assist the BoG.

The institute has different departments, centers and technical service units (TSUs). Each department or centre is headed by a faculty member and each TSU is headed by a faculty member or an officer.

The director is supported in various activities by the deans, i.e. the Dean for Academics, the Dean for Student Welfare, the Dean for faculty welfare, the Dean for Alumni, the Dean for Planning and Development and the Dean for SRICCE (Sponsored Research, Industrial Consultancy, and Continuing Education). The registrar is in charge of all office and staff administration, and has two deputy registrars and six assistant registrars.

A Biswas's administration revamped Organisation structure and introduced Associate Deans for all Six Deanships to meet dynamic needs of the institute.

Departments 
The institute has the following twenty departments which offer B.Tech., B.Arch, B. Tech-M. Tech Dual, M.Tech., M.Sc., Integrated M.Sc., MBA and PhD degree:

Department of Planning and Architecture
 Department of Earth & Atmospheric Sciences
 Department of Biotechnology and Medical Engineering
 Department of Ceramic Engineering
 Department of Chemical Engineering
 Department of Chemistry
 Department of Civil Engineering
 Department of Computer Science and Engineering
 Department of Earth and Atmospheric Science
 Department of Electrical Engineering
 Department of Electronics and Communication Engineering
 Department of Food Process Engineering
 Department of Humanities and Social Sciences
 Department of Industrial Design
 Department of Life Science
 Department of Mathematics
 Department of Mechanical Engineering
 Department of Metallurgical & Materials Engineering
 Department of Mining Engineering
 Department of Physics and Astronomy
 Department of School of Management

Dual degree courses in various disciplines have been introduced recently. The institute provides opportunities for part-time graduate studies in selected fields in addition to doctoral research in various subjects. The institute also has three academic centers and six service centers.

Rankings 

NIT Rourkela was ranked 801–1000 in the world by the Times Higher Education World University Rankings of 2020 and 190 in Asia. In India it was ranked 16 among engineering colleges(including IITs)by the MHRD by the National Institutional Ranking Framework (NIRF) in 2020 and 32 overall. With this NIT Rourkela has bagged top position among the institutes in Odisha.

Student life

Student organisations
NIT Rourkela has as many as 40 clubs or student organizations. These clubs span and promote a variety of interests such as technical, cultural, literary, debating, quizzing, sports, and social service among the students, enabling them to explore and enhance their hitherto hidden talents.

Cultural festivals
NIT Rourkela hosts four major annual events:
 Innovision: a technical festival which showcases the technical talents of the students and the practical applications of their learning
 Vriddhi: in which students from various colleges participate in various sports and games
 Nitrutsav: a cultural festival where students from all parts of the country participate
 Cosmopolitan Festival:It is a multi-ethnic festival organized by the institute.

HackNITR 
HackNITR is a yearly hackathon event organized in NIT Rourkela. The first event dates back to 2019. HackNITR 3.0 was organized from 29 to 31 October 2021 by students from Google Developer Student Clubs (GDSC) NIT Rourkela in collaboration with OpenCode, Opensource community of NITR. It is one of the eastern India's largest hackathon and had over 2100+ hackers from across the globe.

TEDxNITRourkela 
TEDxNITRourkela is an independently organized TED event, under a license by from TED Conferences LLC. It was organized for the first time in 2011 and again in the following year, 2012. After a long gap, TEDxNITRourkela has been organized on 13 and 14 March 2021 by a team of students from NITR, led by Abel Mathew and Rutaj Dash.

Monday Morning
Monday Morning, also referred to as MM, is the student media platform at NIT Rourkela, founded in 2006, and the name of its e-newsletter. It aims to bridge the gap between the administration and the student community. The MM e-newsletter is published weekly during the academic year.

In its first years of operation, the issues MM covered included construction problems with the new Vikram Sarabhai Residence Hall and child labor abuse in a residence mess. Its coverage of the latter attracted the attention of the Chief Warden, who "formed a team to inspect and raid all halls of residence caterers and mess owners to check on the number of children below the age  working there and how they were treated".

In 2012, it was reported that the newsletter's 'Placement Life' and 'Director's Desk' columns received just under 8,000 website hits per week. That year, The Hindu reported that the newsletter had three chief coordinators, whose role was to set the newsletter's agenda, guide and co-ordinate other team members, and edit articles. Writing articles was done by a content team. Four students were responsible for the newsletter's policies, new features, setting long-term goals, performing regular reviews of the newsletter and taking decisions on coverage of controversial issues. It was reported that students spent two to three hours per week each on the newsletter, using the campus computer facility.

SPIC MACAY NITR Chapter
The SPIC MACAY NITR Chapter was inaugurated on 12 January 2013 by the founder of SPIC MACAY, Dr. Kiran Seth, in the Bhubaneshwar Behera Auditorium.

Notable alumni 

 Damodar Acharya, Former Chairman AICTE and Former Director IIT Kharagpur
 Sandip Das Former CEO, Reliance Jio Infocomm, Former CEO, Maxis Communications
 Ashutosh Dutta Senior Scientist, 5G Chief Strategist at Johns Hopkins University Applied Physics Lab, JHU/APL Sabbatical Fellow, Adjunct Faculty and ECE Chair for EP at Johns Hopkins University.
 Debasish Ghose, Professor at Department of Aerospace Engineering Indian Institute of Science
 CP Gurnani, B.Tech-chemical engineering, managing director and CEO of Tech Mahindra
 Akash Khurana, B.Tech-mechanical engineering, theatre and film personality; COO of NIMBUS
 Nalini Ranjan Mohanty, former IOFS officer, chairman and managing director of the Hindustan Aeronautics Limited (HAL)
 Ajit Andhare, COO, Viacom18 Studios
 Prativa Mohapatra, VP of Adobe India.
 Sudeept Maharana, VP and India Head of Priceline India (Booking Holding)
 Ashish Kundu, Head of Cyber Security Research; Cisco

References

External links 

 

 
National Institutes of Technology
Engineering colleges in Odisha
Educational institutions established in 1961
1961 establishments in Orissa
All India Council for Technical Education